Manoj Kumar Pandey may also refer to:
 Manoj Kumar Pandey (25 June 1975 – 3 July 1999), Indian Army officer 
 Manoj Kumar Pandey (politician), Indian politician